Åryd is a locality situated in Karlshamn Municipality, Blekinge County, Sweden with 336 inhabitants in 2010.

References 

Populated places in Karlshamn Municipality